Still the King is an American sitcom created by Travis Nicholson, Potsy Ponciroli and Billy Ray Cyrus. The series stars Billy Ray Cyrus, Joey Lauren Adams, Madison Iseman, Travis Nicholson, Lacey Chabert and Leslie David Baker. The series premiered on June 12, 2016, on CMT. On July 27, 2016, CMT renewed Still the King for a 13-episode second season, which premiered on July 11, 2017. On November 17, 2017, the series was cancelled after two seasons.

Premise
Vernon Brownmule, aka "Burnin' Vernon," is the second-best Elvis impersonator around. After crashing into a church sign while driving drunk, he has to serve as the church's handyman as part of his parole. He meets an old girlfriend and learns he has a teenage daughter he has never met.

Cast
Billy Ray Cyrus as Vernon Brownmule
Joey Lauren Adams as Debbie Lynn Cooke
Madison Iseman as Charlotte
Travis Nicholson as Walt
Lacey Chabert as Laura Beth
Leslie David Baker as Curtis
Kevin Farley as Mitch Doily
Jon Sewell as Ronnie

Production

In 2013, Hideout Pictures, a subsidiary of music label Average Joes Entertainment produced "Still The King" as self-funded independent pilot. In 2015, the show was picked up by CMT.

Episodes

Series overview

Season 1 (2016)

Season 2 (2017)

Ratings

References

External links
 
 

2010s American single-camera sitcoms
2016 American television series debuts
2017 American television series endings
English-language television shows
CMT (American TV channel) original programming
Television shows set in Tennessee